Nikola Orgill is an Australian women's professional soccer player who currently plays as a defender for Klepp IL in the Toppserien.

Club career

Western Sydney Wanderers
In 2016, Orgill moved from North Shore Mariners to the Western Sydney Wanderers. She made her Wanderers debut on 6 November 2016 in a 4–2 loss against Perth Glory

Newcastle Jets
On 6 October 2017, Newcastle signed Orgill. Nikola Orgill made her debut in Newcastle colours on 29 October 2017 in a 2–1 win against her previous club Western Sydney Wanderers. Her first goal came against Sydney FC on 4 November 2017 to opening the scoring with just two minutes on the clock. She was a key player in helping Newcastle qualify for the Playoffs.

Canberra United
After one season with the Newcastle Jets, Orgill signed with Canberra United for the 2018–19 W-League season.

Kolbotn
In January 2020, Orgill joined Norwegian club Kolbotn.

Return to Western Sydney Wanderers
In November 2020, after playing 12 matches for Kolbotn in the Norwegian Toppserien, Orgill returned to Australia, signing with her first club, Western Sydney Wanderers.

Club statistics

References

External links
 Nikola Orgill at Soccerway
 Nikola Orgill NewcastleJets.com.au

1993 births
Living people
A-League Women players
Western Sydney Wanderers FC (A-League Women) players
Canberra United FC players
Kolbotn Fotball players
Women's association football defenders
Australian women's soccer players